Dover is an unincorporated census-designated place in Hillsborough County, Florida, United States. The population was 3,266 at the 2020 census, down from 3,702 at the 2010 census.

Geography
Dover is located at  (27.994457, -82.216630).

Dover is a Tampa suburb located approximately 24 miles from the Metropolitan Area Business District.
It is 6 miles west of Plant City and 7 miles northeast of Brandon.

Demographics

As of the census of 2000, there were 2,798 people, 751 households, and 615 families residing in the community. The population density was 1,070.7 people per square mile (413.9/km2). The racial makeup of the community was 74.12% White, 0.43% African American, 1.04% Native American, 0.61% Asian, 0.25% Pacific Islander, 19.12% from other races, and 4.43% from two or more races. Hispanic or Latino of any race were 50.86% of the population.

There were 751 households, out of which 45.4% had children under the age of 18 living with them, 63.2% were married couples living together, 10.9% had a female householder with no husband present, and 18.1% were non-families. 10.4% of all households were made up of individuals, and 4.3% had someone living alone who was 65 years of age or older.  The average household size was 3.69 and the average family size was 3.89.

In the community the population was spread out, with 33.0% under the age of 18, 13.0% from 18 to 24, 30.3% from 25 to 44, 17.0% from 45 to 64, and 6.8% who were 65 years of age or older.  The median age was 28 years. For every 100 females there were 115.2 males.  For every 100 females age 18 and over, there were 117.0 males.

The median income for a household in the community was $31,333, and the median income for a family was $31,851. Males had a median income of $28,090 versus $18,472 for females. The per capita income for the community was $10,728.  About 22.3% of families and 28.0% of the population were below the poverty line, including 34.4% of those under age 18 and 20.2% of those age 65 or over.

Education
Elementary: Two elementary schools located in the area are Bailey and Dover.

High: Strawberry Crest High School, the home of the Chargers, is the first high school in Dover, having its first graduating class in 2011. It is also an IB school (the fourth in Hillsborough County).

Charter: Independence Academy on U.S. 92 opened in 2015 or 2016.

Notable people
George B. Sparkman, 19th and 21st Mayor of Tampa (1881–1883, 1887–1888)
Mel Tillis, Country singer.

References

External links

Census-designated places in Hillsborough County, Florida
Census-designated places in Florida